Kerisa is a settlement in the Rift Valley Province of Kenya.

References 

Populated places in Rift Valley Province